Sajeeb Saha, known professionally as Jai Wolf, is a Bangladeshi-American, New York-based electronic music producer. He is best known for his singles, "Indian Summer", "Like It's Over", and "Starlight". He is currently signed to Mom + Pop Music.

Career
Saha was born on November 1, 1991 in Bangladesh. The following year, he moved with his family to the United States, and studied at Herricks High School on Long Island.

In 2011, Saha started producing electronic music under the moniker No Pets Allowed. Within a few years, his mashups and bootleg remixes began to generate attention, quickly rising within the internet music community.

In February 2014, Saha decided to part ways with the project and begin what is now known as Jai Wolf. Within the first few months, the project began to land a string of official remix opportunities for established artists including Melanie Martinez, Dirty South, Alesso and Odesza – each remix landing the #1 spot on Hype Machine. In late 2014, Skrillex turned Jai Wolf's bootleg remix of "Ease My Mind" into an official remix.

In 2015, Jai Wolf released his debut single "Indian Summer" through ODESZA's label, Foreign Family Collective. "Indian Summer" reached number 31 on Billboards Hot Dance/Electronic song's chart. The track also earned a spot on the Triple J 2015 Hottest 100 in Australia.

In May 2016, Jai Wolf released his follow up single, "Drive", through Foreign Family Collective.

On November 18, 2016, Jai Wolf released his debut EP, Kindred Spirits, through Mom + Pop music.

In April 2017, Jai Wolf released his single, "Starlight" which featured Mr Gabriel, followed by a performance at the 2017 Coachella Valley Music and Arts Festival.

On August 10, 2018, "Lost" featuring Chelsea Jade was released on Mom + Pop.

On January 14, 2019, Jai Wolf announced his debut album, The Cure to Loneliness, being released on April 5, 2019. Two singles from the album were released the same day, "Lose My Mind" featuring Mr Gabriel and "Telepathy".

On June 8, 2022, Jai Wolf became the first Bangladeshi artist ever to sell out a concert at Red Rocks Amphitheatre, in Colorado, with the collaborative one-off concert "Infinite Light" with San Holo, one week after the release of their collaboration "We Will Meet Again", released via Mom + Pop Music.

Discography

Studio albums

Extended plays

Singles

Remixes

References

External links 
 

American people of Bangladeshi descent
People from New York (state)
Living people
1991 births
American electronic musicians
Foreign Family Collective artists
New York University Gallatin School of Individualized Study alumni
Mom + Pop Music artists
Herricks High School alumni